Koh Sotin is a district (srok) located in Kampong Cham province, Cambodia. The district capital is Chi Haer town located around 10 kilometres south of the provincial capital of Kampong Cham by water, but some 42 kilometres by road. The district borders on the southern bank of the Mekong River and includes the islands of Koh Sothin and Koh Mitt in its area.

The district is easily accessed by boat from Kampong Cham. Road access however, is via 12 kilometres of secondary road to National road 11 and then a further 18 kilometres to the intersection with National Highway 7. From this intersection in Tbong Khmom district is it a further 12 kilometres west to the provincial capital. This small relatively narrow district follows the south bank of the Mekong for about 25 kilometres. As the district is low lying, much of the land area of the district is inundated when the Mekong rises during the wet season.

An unusual birth 
On 11 November 2004, Koh Sotin was home to an unusual birth. A two headed calf was born to a local farmer and a rumour quickly spread that it was a miracle that might help students pass their upcoming exams. Hundreds of students flocked to burn incense and make offerings to the dead calf, hoping that the miracle might increase their brainpower. The farmer who owned the animal packed the dead body in ice to slow decomposition and take advantage of the windfall. Hopeful pilgrims were willing to pay anything from a few cents to a few dollars for an audience with the deceased bovine.

Location 
Koh Sotin district is in southern Kampong Cham Province. The Mekong runs along the northern border of the district and the district boundary includes the river itself to midstream. Reading from the north clockwise, Koh Sotin shares a border with Kang Meas and Kampong Siem districts to the north and the district of Kampong Cham to the north east. Tbong Khmom and Ou Reang Ou districts are to the east. To the south is Sithor Kandal district of Prey Veng province and Srei Santhor district lies on the western boundary.

Administration 
The Koh Sotin district governor reports to Hun Neng, the Governor of Kampong Cham. The following table shows the villages of Koh Sotin district by commune.

Demographics 
The district is subdivided into 8 communes (khum) and 85 villages (phum). According to the 1998 Census, the population of the district was 70,672 persons in 14,187 households in 1998. With a population of over 70,000 people, Koh Sotin has one of the smallest populations for districts in Kampong Cham province after Dambae and Kampong Cham districts. The average household size in Koh Sotin is 5.0 persons per household, which is slightly smaller than the rural average for Cambodia (5.2 persons). The sex ratio in the district is 89.6%, with significantly more females than males.

Tourism 
Wat Moha Leap, the only wooden-frame pagoda still standing in Cambodia, is a popular touristic destination located in Koh Sotin District.

References

External links
update 23-09-2019 by yim marin
Kampong Cham at Royal Government of Cambodia website
Kampong Cham at Ministry of Commerce website

Districts of Kampong Cham province